Staryya Darohi District is the second-level administrative subdivision (raion) of Belarus in the Minsk Region.

There are seven selsoviets in the Staryya Darohi District:

 Drazhnovsky
 Novodorozhsky
 Pasek
 Polozewiczski
 Starodorozhsky
 Shchitkovichi
 Yazylsky

The Gorki selsoviet was abolished in 2013.

References

 
Districts of Minsk Region